KMUM-CD (channel 33) and KMMW-LD (channel 33) are low-power television stations licensed to Sacramento and Stockton, California, United States. Both stations are translators of Sacramento-licensed Telemundo owned-and-operated station KCSO-LD (channel 33).

History

On September 25, 2006, these stations switched to the new MTV Tr3́s network (now simply known as Tr3́s since July 2010), which was created as a result of Viacom's acquisition of Más Música TeVe. Low-power analog station KMMK-LP, channel 14 in Sacramento used to simulcast with KMUM and KMMW.

In 2014, Serestar Communications agreed to purchase both KMUM and KMMW from Viacom for a disclosed amount. The sale of both stations was finalized on September 25, 2014. Prior to the sale, both of the stations dropped the Tr3́s affiliation and switched to Telemundo. After the sale, they became sister stations to KCSO-LD, which is also a Telemundo affiliate.

Serestar agreed to sell KMUM-CD, KMMW-LD, and KCSO-LD to NBCUniversal on November 28, 2018, as part of a $21 million deal. The sale was completed on March 5, 2019.

Subchannels
The stations' digital signals are multiplexed:

References

External links
 
 
 

Low-power television stations in the United States
NBCUniversal television stations
MUM-CD
Television channels and stations established in 1999
1999 establishments in California